Academia, Business and Politics

Ian Khama
Manne Dipico
Mamokgethi Phakeng
Mokgweetsi Masisi
Dikgang Moseneke
Popo Molefe
Edna Molewa
Thandi Modise
Kgalema Motlanthe
Sir Seretse Khama
Kgosi Leruo Molotlegi
Supra Mahumapelo
Sir Ketumile Masire
Mogoeng Mogoeng
Festus Mogae
Patrice Motsepe
Tshepo Motsepe
Lucas Mangope
Mmusi Maimane
Nthato Motlana
Mpule Kwelagobe
Sol Plaatje 
Keorapetse Kgositsile
Unity Dow
Khama III
Prof Dan Kgwadi
Yvonne Mokgoro
David Magang
Moses Kotane
Z. K. Matthews
Joe Matthews
Dipuo Peters
Ruth Mompati
Naledi Pandor
Frances Baard
James Moroka
Abram Onkgopotse Tiro
Job Mokgoro
Media

Connie Ferguson
Bonang Matheba
Cassper Nyovest
Khuli Chana
Bontle Modiselle
Manaka Ranaka
A-Reece
Fifi Cooper
Goapele
Earl Sweatshirt (American rapper whose father is Tswana) 
HHP
Rapulana Seiphemo
Kagiso Lediga 
Boity Thulo
Katlego Danke
Kabelo Mabalane
DJ Fresh
Tim Modise
Emma Wareus
Faith Nketsi
Tuks Senganga
Gail Nkoane Mabalane
Redi Tlhabi
Lerato Molapo
Tumi Molekane
Motlatsi Mafatshe
Vuyo Dabula
Presley Chweneyagae
Mothusi Magano

Sports

Amantle Montsho
Teko Modise
Itumeleng Khune
Kagiso Rabada
Percy Tau
Kaizer Motaung
Pitso Mosimane
Jimmy Tau
Dikgang Mabalane
Kaizer Motaung Junior
Baboloki Thebe
Katlego Mphela
Jerome Ramatlhakwane
Dipsy Selolwane
David Bright
Mogakolodi Ngele

Tswana
Tswana people